The First Degree is a silent film from 1923 directed by Edward Sedgwick. The film is a rural melodrama starring Frank Mayo, Sylvia Breamer, and Philo McCullough. A Universal Pictures production, it is one of the Carl Laemmle-endorsed “The Laemmle Nine,” nine films released from Christmas 1922 to February 19, 1923. The screenplay by George Randolph Chester is based on the short story “The Summons” by George Pattullo (published in The Saturday Evening Post in 1914). The cinematography is by Benjamin H. Kline.

Long thought to be a lost film, a complete, partially-tinted 35mm domestic distribution print of the film was discovered at Chicago Film Archives in June 2020 in the Charles E. Krosse Collection, a collection of mostly agricultural and sponsored films produced and distributed by C.L. Venard Productions of Peoria, Illinois. CFA has since digitally preserved the film.

Cast 
 Frank Mayo as Sam Purdy
 Sylvia Breamer as Mary
 Philo McCullough as Will
 George A. Williams as Sheriff
 Harry Carter as District Attorney

Plot 
Sam Purdy receives a call from the Grand Jury of Lincoln County. He is wanted to give testimony in a case involving the theft of his sheep, but before he learns this, he makes a confession regarding the murder of his half-brother, Will, the night before. Purdy goes on to tell the jury of the myriad ways his brother has wronged him over the last several years, motivated out of a mutual affection for a woman named Mary. Via flashback, Sam tells the room of how Will had him sent to jail for a year for a bank robbery he did not commit. While in jail, Sam studied law and starts life afresh when released. Sam runs for County Prosecutor and all is going well with him until Will turns up, threatens blackmail, and exposes his past and forces him to again leave town. Sam gets another start and is successful as a sheep farmer in a rural town when Will again appears and blackmails him. A fight takes place and Sam supposes that he has killed his brother in the scuffle. But as he finishes his testimony before the Grand Jury, much to the surprise of the members, in comes the sheriff conveying the prisoner in the sheep-stealing case is Will.

See also 
 List of rediscovered films

References

External links 
 
 
 
 
 Charles E. Krosse Collection at Chicago Film Archives

1923 films
1920s rediscovered films
American silent feature films
Rediscovered American films
Melodrama films
Silent American drama films
1923 drama films
American black-and-white films
Universal Pictures films
Films directed by Edward Sedgwick
1920s American films